Shiplake Vikings Rowing Club is a rowing club based on the River Thames at Shiplake College Boathouse, Henley-on-Thames, Oxfordshire.

History
The club was founded during the 1980s following discussions at the Baskerville Arms which resulted in permission from Shiplake College to use their boathouse facilities. New boathouse plans for the College have been passed and construction started in 2019.

In recent years the club has produced some national champions.

Club colours
The blade colours are maroon, yellow and black; kit: black and black.

Honours

National champions

References

Sport in Oxfordshire
Henley-on-Thames
Rowing clubs in England
Rowing clubs in Oxfordshire
Rowing clubs of the River Thames